Saverio "Sam" Grana is a Canadian Academy Award-nominated television and film producer and screenwriter, most noted for the film Train of Dreams and the television miniseries The Boys of St. Vincent.

Career 
For much of his career he was associated with the National Film Board of Canada, for whom he was one of the originators alongside directors Giles Walker and John N. Smith of the studio's 1980s foray into "alternative drama" docufiction filmmaking. He left the NFB in the 1990s and was briefly executive director of Film NB, the provincial filmmaking agency in New Brunswick, from March 1997 before resigning in August 1998. He then formed his own production firm, Grana Productions, for which his projects included the documentary television series Eastern Tide, and the films Geraldine's Fortune and Black Eyed Dog.

At the 9th Genie Awards in 1988, Train of Dreams was a nominee for Best Picture, and Grana was a nominee alongside Smith and Sally Bochner for Best Screenplay. At the 8th Gemini Awards in 1994, Grana, Smith and Des Walsh won the Gemini Award for Best Writing in a Dramatic Program or Miniseries for The Boys of St. Vincent.
Sam Grana was nominated for an academy award in 1981 for "Short Winter",a short film about an Irish family immigrating to North America in the 1890's.

He has also had a small number of acting roles, most notably as Alex Rossi in Walker's docufiction trilogy The Masculine Mystique, 90 Days and The Last Straw.  He also appeared in The Boys of St. Vincent, in the minor role of Monsignor Forucco.

Nominations 

Grana was nominated for an academy award in 1981 for "Short Winter".

He was a Genie Award nominee for Best Supporting Actor at the 7th Genie Awards in 1986 for 90 Days.

References

External links

Canadian male film actors
Canadian male television actors
Canadian film producers
Canadian television producers
Canadian male screenwriters
Canadian television writers
Canadian people of Italian descent
Living people
National Film Board of Canada people
Cinema of New Brunswick
Canadian male television writers
Year of birth missing (living people)
20th-century Canadian screenwriters
20th-century Canadian male writers